Curtis Dublanko (born February 12, 1988) is a professional Canadian football linebacker who most recently played for the Edmonton Eskimos of the Canadian Football League. He was drafted 15th overall by the Montreal Alouettes in the 2010 CFL Draft and signed with the team on April 2, 2011 after finishing his final year at the University of North Dakota. He played college football for the North Dakota Fighting Sioux.

References

External links
 Edmonton Eskimos bio 
 Montreal Alouettes bio

1988 births
Living people
Canadian football linebackers
Edmonton Elks players
Montreal Alouettes players
North Dakota Fighting Hawks football players
Players of Canadian football from Alberta